Edens Lost (1969) is a novel by Australian writer Sumner Locke Elliott.

Plot summary
The novel is a family saga told through the eyes of 16-year-old Angus Weekes who goes to live with the St James family in the Blue Mountains area of New South Wales after the death of his guardian.

Critical reception
On its original publication Kirkus Review found: "All of this is, in its fashion, opulently romantic and pleasantly parlayed in silvery, sugary words (delightfuls and entrancings) without altogether forfeiting the realities of living and loving it sometimes seems to camouflage."

Dennis Altman nominated the book as his favourite novel in The Australian and noted: "Like all of Elliott's writings based on his formative years, Edens Lost evokes pre-Menzies Australia through writing that is beautiful and precise. I suspect Elliott is one of the greatest stylists Australian writing has produced, even if a contemporary reader may lose patience at the careful accumulation of detail and minute observation that evokes for me the Sydney in which my parents met and married. I read Edens Lost when it was first published, in the early days of gay liberation, both knowing and not knowing that only a gay man could have written this book."

Notes 
 Dedication: For Marie
 Epigraph: "Where the apple reddens / Never pry - / Lest we lose our Edens, / Eve and I." / Browning, 'A Woman's Last Word'

Television adaptation 
The novel was adapted for a television mini-series, produced by Australian Broadcasting Corporation (ABC) and Central Independent Television. The adaptation was directed by Neil Armfield, from a script by Michael Gow, and featured Julia Blake, Arthur Dignam and Linda Cropper.  It was broadcast in Australia on the ABC over 3 episodes commencing on 28 February 1989.

See also 
 1969 in Australian literature

References

1969 Australian novels